Temognatha affinis is a jewel beetle in the family Buprestidae, found in New South Wales.
It was first described in 1868 by Edward Saunders as Stigmodera affinis.

The adults are diurnal, and eat flowers. The larvae are wood-borers.

See also
Woodboring beetle

References

Insects of Australia
Buprestidae
Woodboring beetles
Beetles described in 1868
Taxa named by Edward Saunders (entomologist)